Mario Ardissone (9 October 1900 – 1975) was an Italian footballer who played as a midfielder.

Career
Ardissone played for 6 seasons (161 games, 6 goals) in the Italian Serie A for U.S. Pro Vercelli Calcio. Ardissone made his debut for the Italy national football team on 20 January 1924 in a game against Austria. He was also part of Italy's squad at the 1924 Summer Olympics, but he did not play.

References

External links
 

1900 births
1975 deaths
People from Vercelli
Italian footballers
F.C. Pro Vercelli 1892 players
Italy international footballers
Serie A players
Olympic footballers of Italy
Footballers at the 1924 Summer Olympics
Association football midfielders